Elie railway station served the town of Elie and Earlsferry, Fife, Scotland, from 1863 to 1965 on the Fife Coast Railway.

History 

A camping coach was positioned here by the Scottish Region from 1953 to 1955 and two coaches from 1956 to 1963.

The station closed to passengers on 6 September 1965. The line closed to goods traffic on 18 July 1966.

The site of the station is now occupied by modern housing.

References

Bibliography 
 
 
 
 

Disused railway stations in Fife
Former North British Railway stations
Railway stations in Great Britain opened in 1863
Railway stations in Great Britain closed in 1965
1863 establishments in Scotland
1965 disestablishments in Scotland
Beeching closures in Scotland